is a New Zealand rugby union player who plays as a Prop.

References

1998 births
Living people
Rugby union props
Sunwolves players